Beverly Barton Butcher Byron (born July 27, 1932) is an American politician and member of the Democratic Party who served as the U.S. Congresswoman representing the 6th congressional district of Maryland from January 3, 1979, to January 3, 1993.

Biography
Beverly Barton Butcher was born in Baltimore, Maryland to Ruth (née Barton) and Harry C. Butcher, a CBS radio broadcaster and naval aide to General Dwight D. Eisenhower during World War II. During her childhood, her family lived in the Wardman Park Hotel, and her father's connections in Washington, D.C. enabled her to meet and befriend powerful figures such as President Franklin D. Roosevelt, Eleanor Roosevelt, and Dwight and Mamie Eisenhower. Her godfather was political operative George E. Allen.

Byron graduated from the National Cathedral School for Girls in Washington in 1950, and earned a two-year degree from Hood College in Frederick, Maryland in 1962. After graduation she became involved in several nonprofit groups and in fundraising for the Democratic Party. She was first elected to Congress in 1978, succeeding her husband, Goodloe Byron, who died of a heart attack a month before the election. She would be reelected to six additional terms, serving until 1992. She served on the House Armed Services Committee, the Interior and Insular Affairs Committee, and the Select Committee on Aging.

In Congress, Byron particularly focused on military and national security issues. She chaired the House Special Panel on Arms Control and Disarm–ament from 1983 to 1986, and backed the development of the MX Missile. She was the first woman ever to fly aboard the SR-71 Blackbird of the USAF (checkout #429), on which she flew as a VIP in November 1985. A conservative Democrat, Byron opposed abortion and supported the fiscal policies of the Reagan administration. In 1987, she became chairwoman of the Military Personnel and Compensation Subcommittee, beating out the decisively liberal Pat Schroeder, the preferred choice of Armed Services Committee chairman Les Aspin.

Byron was defeated in the 1992 Democratic primary by a somewhat more liberal challenger, State Delegate Thomas Hattery, who in turn lost to Republican nominee Roscoe Bartlett in the general election. After leaving Congress, she served as a commissioner on the 1993 Base Realignment and Closure Commission. In 1995, President Bill Clinton appointed her to the United States Naval Academy Board of Visitors and was also a member of the Board of Regents for the Potomac Institute for Policy Studies. She lives in Frederick, Maryland.

See also
Women in the United States House of Representatives

References

Attribution

External links
 
 Byron Family Papers, circa 1860s-1993, 66 linear feet, at the University of Maryland Libraries Special Collections.
 Beverly Barton Butcher Byron Papers, 1961–1993, 136.50 linear feet at the University of Maryland Libraries Special Collections.

1932 births
20th-century American politicians
20th-century American women politicians
Byron family of Maryland
Democratic Party members of the United States House of Representatives from Maryland
Female members of the United States House of Representatives
Hood College alumni
Living people
National Cathedral School alumni
Politicians from Baltimore
Politicians from Frederick, Maryland
Women in Maryland politics